Jishishan Bonan, Dongxiang and Salar Autonomous County is an autonomous county in the Linxia Hui Autonomous Prefecture, Gansu Province of the People's Republic of China.

The county is located in the mostly mountainous area to the south of the Yellow River, near Gansu's border with Qinghai. The total population was 239,390 in 2020. As the county's name indicates, it has a number of predominantly Muslim ethnic groups, including Hui, Bonan, Dongxiang and Salar. The minority population is 64.9% of the total population. There are 21,400 Bonan people living in Jishishan, which accounts for 95% of all Bonan in China.

Bonan is known for cultivation of Sichuan pepper and walnuts. Its local cuisine includes Bonan style Maisui Baozi and lamb meat.

Administrative divisions
Jishishan County has 4 towns and 13 townships.

Towns 

Townships

References

External links
Official website of Jishishan County Government

 
County-level divisions of Gansu
Autonomous counties of the People's Republic of China
Bonans
Dongxiang people
Salar people
Salar autonomous counties